The Infinite Happiness is a feature-length documentary (85 min) by Ila Bêka & Louise Lemoine which documents their life for about a month inside the “8 House” designed by the architect Bjarke Ingels in Copenhagen.

References

Bibliography

 Inés Lalueta, « THE INFINITE HAPPINESS », Metalocus, 2015-03-11 http://videosarq.blogspot.it/2015/02/the-infinite-happiness-trailer.html]
 ArquiNoticias, « The Infinite Happiness », ArquiNoticias, 2014-11-04 http://videosarq.blogspot.it/2015/02/the-infinite-happiness-trailer.html]
 Ortak Yapımı, « The Infinite Happiness », Mimarizm, 2015-01-30

External links

2015 films
2015 documentary films
French documentary films
Documentary films about architecture
Films set in Copenhagen
2010s English-language films
2010s French films